The 2018–19 East Carolina Pirates women's basketball team will represent East Carolina University during the 2018–19 NCAA Division I women's basketball season. The Pirates, led by first year head coach Chad Killinger and later first year head coach Nicole Mealing, play their home games at Williams Arena at Minges Coliseum and were fifth year members of the American Athletic Conference. They finished the season 16–15, 6–10 AAC play to finish in a tie for seventh place. They defeated SMU in the first round before losing in the quarterfinals of the American Athletic women's tournament to Connecticut.

Assistant coach Killinger was initially named interim head coach of the Pirates for the season, but health concerns led to his resignation 11 games into the season on December 26, 2018, and Killinger's top assistant Mealing was named interim coach for the rest of the season.

Media
All Pirates home games will have a video stream on Pirates All Access, ESPN3, or AAC Digital. Road games will typically be streamed on the opponents website, though conference road games could also appear on ESPN3 or AAC Digital. Audio broadcasts for most road games can also be found on the opponents website.

Roster

Schedule and results

|-
!colspan=9 style=| Non-conference regular season

|-
!colspan=9 style=| AAC regular season

|-
!colspan=12 style=| AAC Women's Tournament

Rankings
2018–19 NCAA Division I women's basketball rankings

See also
2018–19 East Carolina Pirates men's basketball team

References

East Carolina
East Carolina Pirates women's basketball seasons